The men's long jump event at the 2019 Summer Universiade was held on 12 and 13 July at the Stadio San Paolo in Naples.

Medalists

Results

Qualification
Qualification: 8.00 m (Q) or at least 12 best (q) qualified for the final.

Final

References

Long
2019